Tapas Sargharia is an India film director, actor and screenwriter, who works mainly in Ollywood.

Career
Tapas has started his career as an actor in film Pagal Premi in 2007. Then worked as an assistant director in Suna Chadhei Mo Rupa Chadhei in 2009.
Tapas Sargharia has directed Odia language films like Chal Tike Dusta Heba, Hero No.1, Tu Mo Love Story and Ishq Tu Hi Tu.

Filmography

Awards
 Won Best Director at 8th Ruchi OFA-2017.
 Won Best story award for film 'Ishq Tu Hi Tu' at 27th State Film Awards in 2015.

References

External links
 

Odia film directors
Indian filmmakers
Year of birth missing (living people)
Living people